Matsudaira Ietada was the name of at least two samurai who lived in the Sengoku period of Japan:

Matsudaira Ietada (Fukōzu), 1555–1600, samurai who adopted Matsudaira Tadayoshi, son of Tokugawa Ieyasu and Lady Saigo
Matsudaira Ietada (Katahara), 1548–1582, samurai and cousin of Tokugawa Ieyasu